Soul Murder is a 1992 album by Barry Adamson. The album was nominated for the 1992 Mercury Prize.

Reception
Trouser Press called the album "a sketchbook of often brilliant ideas — crime jazz, sinewy dance, smoky bossa nova — all peppered with strange samples . . . and spoken-word bits."

Track listing
All tracks composed and arranged by Barry Adamson; except where indicated

Personnel
Barry Adamson - bass, keyboards, vocals, narration 
Kevin Armstrong - guitar (tracks 7, 12)
Lynn Baker - viola (tracks 6, 9, 11, 13)
Malcolm Baxter - trumpet (tracks 2, 10)
Sarah Brown - choir vocals (track 13)
Patricia Knight - choir vocals (track 13)
Ann Lines - cello (tracks 6, 9, 11, 13)
Billy McGee - conductor, string arrangements (tracks 6, 9, 11, 13)
Arthur Nichols - narrator (track 10)
Audrey Riley - cello (tracks 6, 9, 11, 13)
Marcia Schofield - narrator (track 5)
Enrico Tomasso - trumpet (tracks 2, 10)
Chris Tombling - violin (tracks 6, 9, 11, 13)
Anne Berland - vocals (track 7)
Deloray Campbell - choir vocals (track 13)
Peter Francis - choir vocals (track 13)
Caron Richards - choir vocals (track 13)
Steve Shaw - trumpet (tracks 2, 10)
Maria Zastrow - narrator (track 6)
Jonathan Carney - violin (tracks 6, 9, 11, 13)
Phil Brown - bass trombone (tracks 2, 10)
Clive Dobbins - violin (tracks 6, 9, 11, 13)
Pete Whyman - alto & tenor saxophone (tacks 2, 10)
Chris Pitsillides - viola (tracks 6, 9, 11, 13)
Joe Parker - violin (tracks 6, 9, 11, 13)
Technical
Stan Loubières - recording, mixing
Celia Johnstone - front cover photography

References

1992 albums
Barry Adamson albums
Mute Records albums